Vrhpolje pri Šentvidu is a settlement east of Ivančna Gorica in the Lower Carniola region of Slovenia. The area is now included in the Central Slovenia Statistical Region.

Name
The name of the settlement was changed from Vrhpolje to Vrhpolje pri Šentvidu in 1953. In the past the German name was Oberfeld.

References

External links

Vrhpolje pri Šentvidu on Geopedia

Populated places in the Municipality of Ivančna Gorica